Parliamentary elections were held in Poland on 13 October 2019. All 460 members of the Sejm and 100 senators of the Senate were elected. The ruling Law and Justice (PiS) retained its majority in the Sejm, but lost its majority in the Senate to the opposition. With 43.6% of the popular vote, Law and Justice received the highest vote share by any party since Poland returned to democracy in 1989. The turnout was the highest for a parliamentary election since the first free elections after the fall of communism in 1989. For the first time after 1989, the ruling party controls one house, and the opposition the other.

Background
Following the 2015 parliamentary elections the Law and Justice (PiS) party was able to form a majority government, after receiving 235 seats to the 138 won by their main competitor, Civic Platform, the first time in the post-communist era that a party had won an outright majority in parliamentary elections. Beata Szydło became Prime Minister on 16 November 2015 heading a cabinet that also included Solidary Poland and Poland Together, which ran on joint lists with Law & Justice.

On 23 December 2015 the Sejm passed a law, which reorganized the Constitutional Court, introducing a requirement for a two-thirds majority and the mandatory participation of at least 13, instead of 9 of the 15 judges. In addition, in early 2016 the PiS government passed a law which began the process of giving the government full control of state radio and television. In protest, the Committee for the Defence of Democracy, with help from the Modern party and Civic Platform, started demonstrations across the country.

In December 2016 a parliamentary crisis took place, after the Marshal of the Sejm Marek Kuchciński excluded a Civic Platform's MP Michał Szczerba from the Sejm's proceedings. In protest, members of the opposition occupied the Sejm's rostrum. The Marshal, unable to proceed in the main session chamber, moved the session to the smaller Column Hall. Some politicians and commentators supporting Law and Justice accused opposition of attempting a "coup d'état". It ended fruitlessly for the opposition, though the Modern party was disgraced, as its leader, Ryszard Petru, was photographed flying to Madeira, with fellow MP Joanna Schmidt, during the tense situation. Modern's opinion poll ratings fell as a result.

In December 2017 Mateusz Morawiecki succeeded Beata Szydło as Prime Minister.

December 6, 2018 the Pro-Polish Coalition was formed - an alliance of KORWiN and the National Movement, with more parties joining later in order to contest the 2019 Elections to the European Parliament. The alliance later changed its name to just "Confederation".

In February 2019 the Wiosna party was founded as a left wing anticlerical party. For the 2019 European Parliament elections, the opposition formed a wide coalition, the European Coalition, with the exception of Wiosna. However, PiS won the European elections. Following the loss, the European Coalition dissolved and the Confederation lost many member parties and leaders. In June 2019 Modern and the Civic Platform formed a joint parliamentary club. August 6, the Left was formed, a de facto coalition of Razem, SLD and Wiosna, de jure carrying the SLD name. On August 8, 2019 PSL allied with Kukiz'15 in an alliance named "Polish Coalition".

Electoral system
The 460 members of the Sejm are elected by open party-list proportional representation in 41 multi-member districts. Each district has between 7 and 19 seats.

Seats are allocated using the D'Hondt method, with a 5% threshold for single parties and 8% threshold for coalitions (thresholds are waived for national minorities).

The Senate is elected using first-past-the-post voting in single-member districts. Candidates for Deputies are nominated either by the electoral committees of the various political parties and or by individual voter committees.

Overall, the Sejm includes 460 MPs. Should a party have 231 or more deputies in Parliament, it has an absolute majority and could govern by itself, without a coalition partner.

The constitution can be amended with a supermajority of two-thirds, or 307 deputies.

Election date 
The date of the election, 13 October, was set by the President of Poland, Andrzej Duda.

The Constitution of Poland requires that the next election should take place on a non-working day, Sunday or national holiday, within the 30-day period before the expiry of the 4-year period beginning from the commencement of the current Sejm's and Senate's term of office. Elections can be held earlier under certain conditions, for instance, if the Sejm is dissolved or if no government is formed in time limit set by the constitution.

Since the former Sejm and Senate first sitting took place on 12 November 2015, possible dates were Sundays 13 October, 20 October, 27 October, 3 November and 10 November 2019. The other possible but unlikely dates were public holidays 1 November (All Saints' Day) and 11 November (Independence Day) 2019.

Lists

Electoral committees registered in all constituencies

Electoral committees registered in less than half of the constituencies

Electoral committees with candidates only for the Senate

Campaign slogans

Opinion polls

Results

Sejm

By constituency

Senate

By constituency

Electorate demographics

Notes

Further reading

 Radoslaw Markowski (2020) Plurality support for democratic decay: the 2019 Polish parliamentary election, West European Politics.

References

External links 
 Polish Parliamentary Elections 2019 — National Electoral Commission / National Electoral Office 

Parliamentary election
Polish parliamentary election
Parliamentary elections in Poland
2019 in Poland